A unit of real estate or immovable property is limited by a legal boundary (sometimes also referred to as a property line or a lot line). The boundary (in Latin: limes) may appear as a discontinuation in the terrain: a ditch, a bank, a hedge, a wall, or similar, but essentially, a legal boundary is a conceptual entity, a social construct, adjunct to the likewise abstract entity of property rights.

A cadastral map displays how boundaries subdivide land into units of ownership. However, the relations between society, owner, and land in any culture or jurisdiction is conceived of in terms more complex than a tessellation. Therefore, the society concerned has to specify the rules and means by which the boundary concept is materialized and located on the ground.

A 'Western' version of the boundary determination might be a legally specified procedure, performed by a chartered surveyor, supported by statements from neighbors and pertinent documents, and resulting in official recording in the cadastre as well as boundary markings in the field. Alternatively, indigenous people represent boundaries through ephemeral performances, such as song and dance, and, when in more permanent form, e.g. paintings or carvings, in artistic or metaphorical manner.

Identifying boundaries 

Legal boundaries are usually established by a professional surveyor using a transit and or modern Global Positioning System (GPS) technology. The coordinates of the property line are often described on a drawing called a "plot plan" or "plat" by indicating the length of the boundary along a specific compass bearing in relation to a verifiable "point of beginning". The metes and bounds method is also used to provide a legal description of a property.

The ⅊ symbol may also be used in architectural drawings and CAD design to show plates.

Related concepts 
 Land parcel
 Boundary dispute
 Butts and bounds
 Digital Cadastral DataBase
 National territories and borders
 Redistribution, land consolidation
 Surveying, Coordinate system
 Territory (administrative division)
 Title (property)
 Commons

References

Dyson, L. E.; Hendriks, M.; Grant, S. (2007) Information Technology and Indigenous People. Information Science Publishing.

External links

Geography terminology
Real property law
Social constructionism
Surveying
Land registration
Ownership